Kiki Bertens and Johanna Larsson were the defending champions and successfully defended their title, defeating Natela Dzalamidze and Xenia Knoll in the final, 3–6, 6–3, [10–4].

Seeds

Draw

Draw

References
 Main Draw

Upper Austria Ladies Linz
Generali Ladies Linz Doubles